The 1995 Men's European Volleyball Championship was the nineteenth edition of the event, organized by Europe's governing volleyball body, the Confédération Européenne de Volleyball. It was hosted in two cities in Greece, in Piraeus and Patras, from September 8 to September 16, 1995. The games in Piraeus were held at Peace and Friendship Stadium, whilst in Patras at Dimitrios Tofalos Indoor Hall.

Teams

Group A – Piraeus, Peace and Friendship Stadium
 
 
 
 
 

Group B – Patras, Dimitrios Tofalos Indoor Hall

Final round

Final ranking

References

 CEV Results
  Results
 Czech Results

Men's European Volleyball Championships
E
Volleyball Championship
V
Volleyball Championship
Sports competitions in Patras
September 1995 sports events in Europe